Chilakapadu is a village near Santhanuthala padu mandal (distance 9 km), located in Prakasam district of the Indian state of Andhra Pradesh.

References 

Villages in Prakasam district